Westbrook is a city in Cumberland County, Maine, United States and a suburb of Portland. The population was 20,400 at the 2020 census, making it the fastest-growing city in Maine between 2010 and 2020. It is part of the Portland–South Portland–Biddeford, Maine metropolitan statistical area.

History
Originally known as Saccarappa after Saccarappa Falls on the Presumpscot River, it was a part of Falmouth until February 14, 1814, when it was set off and incorporated as Stroudwater. It soon changed its name to Westbrook after Colonel Thomas Westbrook, a commander during Father Rale's War and King's mast agent who was an early settler and mill operator. In 1871, the town of Westbrook amicably split into two municipalities; the current Westbrook and Deering, which was then annexed by Portland in 1898. In 1891, Westbrook was incorporated as a city.

Saccarappa Falls and Congin Falls provided water power for early mills within the city. In 1829, a sawmill was built at the former which made the mill town noted for its lumber. Other industries followed, manufacturing grain bags, machinery and water wheels, carriage and harness, boots, shoes and moccasins, tinware, leather board, bricks, wooden boxes, box shook, meal and flour. The Portland Manufacturing Company built a cotton textile mill at Saccarappa Falls for making "sheetings, stripes and ducks." A paper mill was built at Cumberland Mills, once an Indian planting ground known as Ammoncongin. By 1859, it produced 1,000 tons of paper annually. In 1867, the factory's name would change to the S. D. Warren Paper Mill.

The Cumberland and Oxford Canal opened in 1832, connecting Portland to Harrison by way of Westbrook and Sebago Lake. It was the primary commercial shipping route for goods until 1871, when it was rendered obsolete by the Portland and Ogdensburg Railroad. Remnants of the canal can still be seen throughout the city, including Beaver Pond, along Stroudwater Street near the Maine Turnpike overpass, and in the woods between Westbrook High School and Oxford-Cumberland Canal Elementary School. In 1885, the city opened Woodlawn Cemetery, the largest cemetery and newest burial grounds in the municipality.

Gallery

Geography
Westbrook is located at  (43.685348, −70.357116).

Bodies of water 

Westbrook is drained primarily by two rivers. The Presumpscot River flows through the center of the city, with two prominent falls (the aforementioned Saccarappa Falls and Congin Falls). The smaller Stroudwater River flows through the southwestern part of the city. The city also contains part of Highland Lake.

Roads and bordering 
Westbrook is served by Interstate 95, U.S. Route 302 and State Routes 22 and 25. State Route 25 has a business route, Route 25 business, which is concurrent with Main Street. It is bordered by Portland to the east, South Portland and Scarborough to the south, Gorham and Windham to the west, and Falmouth to the north.

Ice disk 
In January 2019, a naturally-occurring ice disk measuring about 100 yards across formed on the Presumpscot River. The unusual formation briefly drew international social media and press attention, and boosted tourism to Westbrook.

Demographics

2010 census
As of the census of 2010, there were 17,494 people, 7,568 households, and 4,456 families living in the city. The racial makeup of the city was 92.3% White, 2.3% African American, 0.2% Native American, 1.9% Asian, 0.1% Pacific Islander, 0.6% from other races, and 2.5% from two or more races. Hispanic or Latino of any race were 1.9% of the population.

There were 7,568 households, of which 28.3% had children under the age of 18 living with them, 41.2% were married couples living together, 13.1% had a female householder with no husband present, 4.6% had a male householder with no wife present, and 41.1% were non-families. 30.4% of all households were made up of individuals, and 12.2% had someone living alone who was 65 years of age or older. The average household size was 2.30 and the average family size was 2.87.

The median age in the city was 39.4 years. 20.9% of residents were under the age of 18; 8.2% were between the ages of 18 and 24; 29.1% were from 25 to 44; 26.5% were from 45 to 64; and 15.2% were 65 years of age or older. The gender makeup of the city was 47.7% male and 52.3% female.

2000 census
As of the census of 2000, there were 16,142 people, 6,863 households, and 4,261 families living in the city. The racial makeup of the city was 96.69% White, 0.88% African American, 0.27% Native American, 0.82% Asian, 0.03% Pacific Islander, 0.28% from other races, and 1.03% from two or more races. Hispanic or Latino of any race were 0.89% of the population.

There were 6,863 households, out of which 29.4% had children under the age of 18 living with them, 46.3% were married couples living together, 12.6% had a female householder with no husband present, and 37.9% were non-families. 30.4% of all households were made up of individuals, and 13.0% had someone living alone who was 65 years of age or older. The average household size was 2.33 and the average family size was 2.90.

In the city, the age distribution of the population shows 23.4% under the age of 18, 7.3% from 18 to 24, 31.0% from 25 to 44, 22.7% from 45 to 64, and 15.5% who were 65 years of age or older. The median age was 38 years. For every 100 females, there were 89.1 males. For every 100 females age 18 and over, there were 82.8 males.

The median income for a household in the city was $37,873, and the median income for a family was $47,120. Males had a median income of $32,412 versus $25,769 for females. The per capita income for the city was $19,501. About 6.7% of families and 8.3% of the population were below the poverty line, including 13.7% of those under age 18 and 5.7% of those age 65 or over.

Economy

Now primarily a suburb of the larger city of Portland, Westbrook itself has a growing business base and developing core downtown district. IDEXX Laboratories, Inc., a major multi-national corporation, is headquartered in Westbrook. In addition to the downtown area, many of the city's businesses are located within two industrial parks (the Col. Westbrook Industrial Park and Five Star Industrial Park), as well as in the area surrounding Maine Turnpike Exit 48.

The city is home to Sappi Ltd.'s Westbrook Paper  Mill and R&D Center. The mill, formerly the S. D. Warren Paper Mill, was once the city's largest employer and taxpayer, employing over 3,000 people and representing over 50% of the city's tax base. However, foreign competition and the age of the mill have drastically reduced its workforce and production. Today the mill has found a niche in the marketplace, becoming one of the nation's top manufacturers of release papers and employing about 300 people. Idexx Laboratories has since surpassed the mill as the city's largest taxpayer. Westbrook was also the home of the first Sebago-Moc shoe factory.

Westbrook is home to the TV station WMTW, southern Maine's ABC affiliate. The station has its studios off County Road.

The faith-based Mercy Hospital of Portland operates Mercy Westbrook, a small community hospital with a minor emergency room and inpatient treatment facilities. Spring Harbor Hospital, southern Maine's only private psychiatric treatment and recovery center, is also located within the city.

Education

Westbrook's public schools are part of the Westbrook School Department.
 Westbrook High School – Blue Blazes
 Westbrook Middle School, (grades 5–8) (formerly Fred C. Wescott Junior High School) –  Falcons
 Congin Elementary School, (grades K–4) – Cougars
 Canal School Elementary School, (grades K–4) – Coyotes
 Saccarappa Elementary School, (grades K–4) – Shining Stars

The Wescott Junior High School building is now the Westbrook Community Center, with Westbrook Middle School occupying a newly constructed and subsequently expanded facility on a different site down the road from Westbrook High School. Other former schools in the city include Prides Corner Elementary School, which was closed in 2012 and subsequently demolished, with apartments and houses built on the property.

Churches

Westbrook is home to many churches including

Catholic
 St. Anthony of Padua (St. Hyacinth)
 St. Edmund's

Evangelical Free
 First Evangelical Free Church

Lutheran
 Trinity Lutheran Church

Methodist-United
 Westbrook United Methodist

Nondenominational or Interdenominational
 New Life Fellowship

Not Indicated
 Covenant Family Fellowship

Pentecostal
 Acceleration Church
 Vineyard Christian Fellowship

United Church of Christ
 Westbrook-Warren Congregational Church

Baptist
 First Baptist Church
 Westbrook Baptist Church

Government and elections

The Westbrook City Council consists of five councilors each representing one of the five city wards and two at-large councilors. The current mayor is Michael Foley. Colleen Hilton was mayor of Westbrook from November 2009 – 2016.

Voter registration

Libraries
 Walker Memorial Library
 Warren Memorial Library (closed in 2009)

Neighborhoods
Similar to neighboring Portland and South Portland, Westbrook contains several distinct neighborhoods that are generally recognized by residents but have no legal or political significance. Unlike Portland, however, there is no official signage recognizing these neighborhoods. Some of the notable neighborhoods include:

 Birdland
 Cumberland Mills
 Deer Hill
 Frenchtown
 The Hamlet
 Prides Corner
 Old Millbrook
 Westbrook Pointe
 Woodland
 Colonial Village
 Highland Lake

Recreation

In addition to the sports complexes located at Westbrook High School and other schools, the city offers several public recreational areas and facilities, including:
 Bicentennial Park & Skate Park
 Riverbank Park
 Westbrook River Walk – along Presumpscot River in downtown area
 Cornelia Warren Memorial Trail – along Presumpscot River between Ash St. and Cumberland St.
 Westbrook River Trail – along Presumpscot River north and east of the Sappi paper mill
 Rocky Hill – network of trails behind Wescott Community Centre
 Warren Little League Complex
 Lincoln Street skating rink – ice hockey in colder months, roller hockey in warmer months
 East Bridge Street skating rink – winter use only
 Stroudwater Street skating rink – winter use only
 East Bridge Street ballfields
 Warren League Grounds
 Warren Pool – outdoor public pool, summer use only
 Davan Pool – indoor pool, open year-round

Sites of interest
 Acorn Productions Performing Arts Center
 Westbrook Historical Society & Museum
 Warren Memorial Fountain

Notable people 

 Benjamin Paul Akers, sculptor
 John Cumberland, professional baseball player 
 Philip E. Curran, banker and state legislator
 Robert W. Duplessie, state legislator
 Kevin Eastman, cartoonist, co-creator of the Teenage Mutant Ninja Turtles
 James Deering Fessenden, Civil War general
 Ginger Fraser, American football player and coach
 Scott Garland (a.k.a. Scotty 2 Hotty), professional wrestler
 George Gore, professional baseball player
 Al Hawkes, musician
 Nancy A. Henry, poet
 Curtis Jonathan Hussey (a.k.a. Fandango), professional wrestler
 Edmund Needham Morrill, U.S. Congressman and governor of Kansas
 Eliza Happy Morton, author and educator
 Ann Peoples, state legislator
 Alexander Speirs, state legislator
 Avadis Tevanian, venture capitalist
 Ronald Usher, state legislator
 Rudy Vallée, musician, band leader, actor and entertainer
 Thomas Westbrook, namesake of Westbrook

References

External links
 City of Westbrook, Maine
 Walker Memorial Library
 Westbrook Chamber of Commerce

 
Populated places established in 1814
Portland metropolitan area, Maine
Cities in Maine
Company towns in Maine
Cities in Cumberland County, Maine